Harry Markham is an English former professional rugby league footballer who played in the 1950s.

International honours
Harry Markham won a cap for England while at Hull in 1953 against France.

References

External links
 (archived by web.archive.org) Stats → PastPlayers → M at hullfc.com
 (archived by web.archive.org) Statistics at hullfc.com

Living people
England national rugby league team players
English rugby league players
Hull F.C. players
Place of birth missing (living people)
Rugby league second-rows
Year of birth missing (living people)